Sondra Rodgers (born Fenella Jewell Rodgers; 1903–1997) was an American film and television actress.

Early years
Born Fenella Jewell Rodgers, she grew up on the family farm in Trimble County, Kentucky. She was the daughter of J.L. Rodgers and his wife, Lacy Rodgers. When she was 17, she moved to New York and began modeling for a commercial photographer.

Radio
Rodgers left the stage to work in radio in 1934. She was heard often in the United States on broadcasts of Miniature Theater of the Air and on a number of soap operas.

She also worked in radio in Europe. Although she was employed by Radio Luxembourg, she was based in London. Her programs were recorded and shipped to Luxembourg for broadcast. After concluding her work in Europe, she returned to Kentucky and wrote scripts for WLAP in Lexington.

Stage
Rodgers' early acting experience came in New York when she worked (using the name Sondra Arleaux) in stock theater with Jessie Bonstelle. She appeared on Broadway in Riddle Me This (1933).

Rodgers spent time in Europe studying with playwrights, then returned to the United States, where she directed plays at the Pasadena Playhouse with Gilmour Brown as her supervisor.

Later, in Los Angeles, Rodgers acted in plays, including No Time for Comedy, Heaven Can Wait, Cry Havoc, an dFamily Portrait.

Film
Rodgers signed her first film contract, with Metro-Goldwyn-Mayer, in May 1944. Her film debut came in Marriage Is a Private Affair (1944).

Television
Rodgers portrayed Mrs. Appleby in the 1961 episode "A Doctor Comes to Town" of the television series Window on Main Street.

Filmography

References

Bibliography
 Erickson, Hal. Military Comedy Films: A Critical Survey and Filmography of Hollywood Releases Since 1918. McFarland, 2012.

External links

1903 births
1997 deaths
American film actresses
American television actresses
20th-century American actresses
People from Trimble County, Kentucky
Actresses from Kentucky